Salvador Pineda Popoca (born June 16, 1952 in Huetamo, Michoacan, Mexico) is a Mexican actor, who has participated in over 20 Mexican telenovelas and Mexican movies, as well as two Hollywood low budget movies. Born to Mexican politician Salvador Pineda who served under Mexican President Adolfo Ruiz Cortines, and Gloria Pineda, house-wife. His uncle (on his mother's side) is the renowned Mexican cardiologist Ignacio Chavez Sanchez.

Biography
Salvador Pineda is known for his acting on many Televisa soap operas, including 1980s Colorina with Lucía Méndez, and Mi Pequeña Soledad with Verónica Castro. He is also remembered for his soap opera Tu o Nadie with Lucía Mendez and Andrés García. Pineda and García were considered two of the sexiest Latino actors of the 1980s, appearing in shirtless photos in magazines sold in Latin America.

Pineda's identifiable, gravelly voice and his physique led to his being type-cast as a villain, or, less frequently as a gruff, edgy heroic lead.

Pineda began his internationalization in 1984, when he worked in Puerto Rico as the star of canal 2's Coralito, with Sully Diaz. He returned to Puerto Rico in 1985, to film another telenovela with canal 2.

Pineda also made an attempt at a singing career, having released one CD. He is divorced from Venezuelan actress Mayra Alejandra.
He has a daughter, but is very private about it.

Telenovelas

Sources

Official "El Juramento" Website

1952 births
Living people
Mexican male film actors
Mexican male telenovela actors
Male actors from Mexico City